Trifolium incarnatum, known as crimson clover or Italian clover, is a species of flowering plant in the family Fabaceae, native to most of Europe. It has been introduced to other areas, including the United States and Japan. 

This upright annual herb grows to 20–50 cm (8-20") tall, unbranched or branched only at the base. The leaves are trifoliate with a long petiole, each leaflet hairy, 8–16 mm across, with a truncated or bilobed apex. The flowers are produced throughout the spring and summer, rich red or crimson, congested on an elongated spike inflorescence 3–5 cm tall and 1.5 cm broad; the individual flowers are up to 10–13 mm long and have five petals. The banner of each flower does not sit upright, but folds forward.

Uses

Crimson clover is commonly used in agriculture as a nitrogen-fixing cover crop. The plant uses associations with Rhizobia bacteria to fix nitrogen. The plant is widely grown as a protein-rich forage crop for cattle and other livestock, and is suitable to be made into hay. It is commonly grazed by domestic and wild ruminants. It is often used for roadside erosion control, as well as beautification, however it tends to eliminate all other desirable spring and early-summer species of native vegetation in the area where it is planted.

Crimson clover's flowers and the sprouts, which are visually and gustatorily similar to alfalfa sprouts are edible. They can be added as an ingredient in salads, sandwiches, and other dishes, made into tisanes, and can be dried and ground into flour. 100 grams of crimson clover sprouts contains 23 calories, 4g of protein, 2g of fiber, and provides 38 percent of the RDI of vitamin K, as well as 14 percent of the RDI of vitamin C. It has extremely small amounts of calcium, iron, phosphorus, zinc, selenium and magnesium. Like all raw eaten sprouts, they possess the risk of Escherichia coli, Salmonella, Listeria, and Bacillus cereus contamination. However, many reputable facilities in the United States attempt to regulate and test these crops for such bacteria.

Life cycle 
In mild winter areas, such as coastal California and the Pacific Northwest, crimson clover typically behaves as a winter annual. The seeds germinate in the first rains of late summer or autumn. The plants grow through the winter, and have a major flush of bloom in late spring. In dry summer climates, the plants die after maturing seeds. In sites having sufficient summer moisture, plants can continue growth and flowering; and may even behave as short lived perennials.

Cultivation
It is sown as quickly as possible after the removal of a grain crop at the rate of 20–22 kg/ha. It is found to succeed better when only the surface of the soil is stirred by the scarifier and harrow than when a plowing is given. It grows rapidly in spring, and yields an abundant crop of greenery. Only one cutting, however, can be obtained, as it does not shoot again after being mown.

References and external links

 Flora Europaea: Trifolium incarnatum
Ecoflora: Trifolium incarnatum
FAO factsheet: Trifolium incarnatum
 Ajilvsgi, Geyata. (2003). Wildflowers of Texas. Shearer Publishing, Fredericksburg, Texas (USA). .
 Robert W. Freckmann Herbarium, University of Wisconsin Page with several photos.
Ultrastructural details seen on the surface of a "crimson clover", Trifolium incarnatum flower petal.

Forages
incarnatum
Plants described in 1753
Nitrogen-fixing crops
Vegetables
Taxa named by Carl Linnaeus